Stéphanie Dumont (born 5 February 1968) is a French former speed skater. She represented France at the 1988 Winter Olympics in the speed skating event.

References

External links 
 Profile at Speedskatingbase
 
 

1968 births
Living people
French female speed skaters
Speed skaters at the 1988 Winter Olympics
Olympic speed skaters of France